Góra Świętej Anny Landscape Park (Park Krajobrazowy Góra Świętej Anny) is a protected area (Landscape Park) in south-western Poland, established in 1988, covering an area of .

The Park lies within Opole Voivodeship: in Krapkowice County (Gmina Gogolin, Gmina Zdzieszowice) and Strzelce County (Gmina Strzelce Opolskie, Gmina Leśnica). It is centred on and named after the village of Góra Świętej Anny and the hill of the same name (St Anne's hill).

Within the Landscape Park are six nature reserves.

References

Landscape parks in Poland
Parks in Opole Voivodeship
Protected areas established in 1988
1988 establishments in Poland